Six special routes of U.S. Route 75 exist.  Two routes exist in Oklahoma, two in Kansas, one in Nebraska, and two in Iowa.

Henryetta business loop

The first special route along U.S. 75 is U.S. Route 75 Business in Henryetta, Oklahoma, in Okmulgee County. It begins at I-40 exit 237 west of town. It then continues east through the town to end at US-62/75 east of downtown. The entirety of the route is concurrent with Business Loop I-40 and U.S. 62 Business.

Beggs–Sapulpa alternate route

U.S. Route 75 Alternate, the only such special route stemming from U.S. 75, is a former alignment of the mainline highway from east of Beggs to Sapulpa, Oklahoma, a suburb of Tulsa. U.S. 75 Alternate is also sporadically signed as U.S. 75A and State Highway 75A.

The highway begins at U.S. 75 east of Beggs and travels west to that town, where it turns north. It runs through the towns of Mounds and Kiefer before reaching Sapulpa. In Sapulpa, its northern terminus is explicitly signed at an intersection with State Highway 66 and other state highways, but official Oklahoma Department of Transportation maps show it extending northeast along SH-66 until the point where it merges with I-44.

U.S. 75 followed what is now U.S. 75 Alternate prior to 1959. On August 28 of that year, mainline U.S. 75 was rerouted onto the new Okmulgee Beeline freeway and expressway, and U.S. 75 Alternate was established along the former route of the highway.

Altoona business loop

Topeka business loop

Nebraska City business loop

Sioux City business loop

U.S. Highway 75 Business in Sioux City, Iowa was created in 2001 after the completion of a freeway around Sioux City.  Officially, US 75 Business is known as Iowa Highway 376, but it is never signed as such.  The route begins at the I-29/I-129/US 20/US 75 interchange in Sioux City and follows US 75's former route through Sioux City, rejoining US 75 on the city's northern edge.

Northbound US 75 Business traffic follows I-29 southbound.

Le Mars business loop

U.S. Route 75 Business in Le Mars, Iowa was created in 2006 after the completion of a by-pass around Le Mars.  The business route begins at the Iowa Highway 3 interchange, with which the US 75 Business runs concurrently, and ends at the new US 75/Iowa 60 interchange.  The portion of US 75 Business that is not concurrent with Iowa 3 is officially known as Iowa 404, but it is never signed as such.

Former routes

Galveston–Houston temporary route

Houston business loop

Oakhurst-Owasso temporary route

Tulsa business route

Wakarusa–North Topeka alternate

Topeka bypass route

North Topeka–Hoyt alternate

References

75
 
75
75
75
S75